Chandragiri is one of the two hills in Shravanabelagola in the Indian state of Karnataka, the other one being Vindhyagiri. It is also near Indragiri.

History
The recorded history surrounding the hill started in 300 BC when last Shruthakevali Bhadrabahu and Chandragupta Maurya visited the place in order to attain kaivalya(beatitude). The small hill derives its name of Chandra because Chandragupta was the first of the rishis who lived and performed penance there.

Kalbappu was the early name of the hill and it dominates the history of the town of Shravanabelagola between 3rd century BC and 12th century AD. The Jain traditions link the Maurya Empire Emperor Chandragupta and his teacher Bhadrabahu with this place. Of the total number of 106 memorials found at Shravanabelagola, 92 are located on the small hill. Of these, about 47 memorials of monks, 9 of nuns, and 5 of householders belong to the 7th and 8th century. This points out at the popularity of the custom, and of its extensive prevalence on the small hill.

Geography

The hill is situated about 3049 feet from mean sea level and 200 feet from the above the ground level and is situated in the northwest entrance of the town. A vast expanse of granite rock, scattered large and small boulders can be found en route to the peak.

Monuments

A number of Jain basadis are found on the Hill. Some of the prominent ones are:

 Chavundaraya Basadi
 Chandragupta Basadi
 Shantinatha Basadi
 Parshvanatha Basadi
 Kattale Basadi
 Majjigana Basadi
 Shasana Basadi
 Chandraprabha Basadi
 Parshwanatha Basadi II
 Eradukatte Basadi
 Savatigandhavarana Basadi
 Terina Basadi
 Shantishwara Basadi
 Iruve-Brahmadeva Basadi

Apart from these a number of other monuments such as Bhadrabahu Cave, Marasimha's Manastambha, Mahanavami Mantapa, Bhadrabahu Inscriptions, Gangaraja Mantap and Nishidhi Mantaps can be found on Chandragiri.

An idol of Bharata, Bahubali's older brother, carved from soapstone can be found here. The statue is damaged below the thighs. It bears a striking resemblance to that of the Bahubali statue on the Vindhyagiri Hills.

Gallery

Notes

References

External links

Jain temples in Karnataka
Hills of Karnataka
Geography of Hassan district
Indian inscriptions
Tourist attractions in Hassan district